The Ven William Richards (1643–1712)  was Archdeacon of Berkshire from 1689 until 1698.

He matriculated from All Souls' College, Oxford in  1660; and became its Chaplain. He was Rector of Heythrop from 1675; and Vicar of St Giles' Church, Reading from 1678.

He died on 4 October 1712.

References

1643 births
Alumni of All Souls College, Oxford
Archdeacons of Berkshire
1712 deaths